Tjorven is a fictional character created by Swedish writer Astrid Lindgren.

Tjorven may also refer to:

Tjorven (vehicle), a Swedish manufactured delivery van
Tjörven De Brul, Belgium international footballer
Tjorven, nickname of Swedish swimmer Eva Andersson

See also
 Samuel Torvend, American theologian